Labours of Love – The Best of Hue and Cry is a greatest hits compilation by Scottish duo Hue and Cry, released in 1993.

Track listing
All tracks written by Gregory Kane and Patrick Kane, except where noted.
 "Labour of Love"
 "I Refuse"
 "Sweet Invisibilty"	
 "Looking for Linda"	
 "My Salt Heart"	
 "Violently (Your Words Hit Me)"	
 "Strength to Strength"
 "Ordinary Angel"	
 "Long Term Lovers of Pain"
 "She Makes a Sound"
 "Widescreen"
 "Stars Crash Down"
 "Peaceful Face" (Live)
 "The Man with the Child in His Eyes" (Live) (Kate Bush)
 "Truth"
 "Labour of Love" (7" Urban Edit)

Charts

Weekly charts

References

External links
 Labours of Love – The Best of Hue and Cry at Discogs

Hue and Cry albums
1993 greatest hits albums